Frederik Du Chau (born 15 May 1965) is a Belgian film director, screenwriter and animator.

Career
Du Chau attended the Academy of Fine Arts in his hometown of Ghent, where he studied film and majored in animation under Raoul Servais. After graduation, he worked for Walt Disney Animation France and later as a freelance animator and directed several local commercials, combining live-action and animation.

The selection of his student film, The Mystery of the Lamb (Het mysterie van het lam), for the Los Angeles Animation Celebration Conference brought him to Hollywood where he was offered a job as an animator and later as a visual development and storyboard artist for Disney, Warner Bros., and Universal.

Du Chau's break as a director came when Sony offered him to co-direct a short film with Hoyt Yeatman for Sony Wonder. This was followed with a stint as a storyboard artist for Chuck Jones where he learned everything he could about gags, timing and funny business from the master himself.

After a job as the animation director for Universal's The Land Before Time III: The Time of the Great Giving, Du Chau was then offered a position as a visual development artist at the newly formed Warner Bros. Feature Animation department, where he sold two screenplays. He was attached to one of them as a director and was soon offered to direct the first animated feature for Warner Bros. Quest for Camelot.

Du Chau wrote and sold a couple of screenplays with Kirk DeMicco. One of the screenplays, titled Sky Boys, is a drama about two Irish immigrants who fight over the love of one girl while building the Empire State Building. Another screenplay was titled Hong Kong Phooey, based on the popular cartoon and was sold to Alcon and Warner Bros. This led to the opportunity to write and direct Racing Stripes for Warner Bros.

The moderate success of Racing Stripes led to the job of directing the American feature film titled, Underdog, for The Walt Disney Company, based on the popular 60s cartoon of a flying dog that becomes a superhero. It starred James Belushi, Jason Lee and Amy Adams. The film was extremely negatively received by critics.

He is currently attached to three different movies at several major studios. He just started filming The Krostons, based on the popular Belgian comic book series by Paul Deliege, his first Stereoscopic 3D movie for which he also wrote the screenplay.

When not directing Du Chau draws and develops his own series of graphic novels Fish Out Of Water. His graphic novel work was recently selected at the Festival d'Angouleme 2008 to be exhibited as one of the Unpublished Young talents.

He currently lives and works in San Francisco, California.

Filmography

References

External links

Frederik Du Chau's biography
Air-Edel Associates Profile

1965 births
Living people
People from Ghent
Belgian film directors
Belgian screenwriters
Belgian animators
Belgian storyboard artists
Belgian animated film directors
Belgian expatriates in the United States